Ilze Jākobsone (born 19 April 1994) is a Latvian basketball player for TTT Riga and the Latvian national team.

She participated at the EuroBasket Women 2017.

References

1994 births
Living people
Latvian women's basketball players
Basketball players from Riga
Point guards